Elisabeth Tamm (30 June 1880, at the manor Fogelstad in Julita, Södermanlands län – 23 September 1958) was a Swedish liberal politician and women's rights activist. She was known in the parliament as Tamm i Fogelstad ("Tamm of Fogelstad").

Life

She was the eldest daughter and heiress of the Parliamentarian and landowner August Tamm and Baroness Emma Åkerhielm af Margrethelund.  She and her sister Märta were schooled at home by a governess, and were also instructed by their father in managing an estate.  Elisabeth attended lectures at Uppsala University; however, in 1905 she inherited Fogelstad Manor from her father, and abandoned her plans to study in order to attend to her estate.  She never married.

Her father being a politician, Tamm showed an early interest in politics and the growing women's movement.

Political career

Being an unmarried woman of legal majority as well as a wealthy property owner, she fulfilled the criteria which made her qualified to vote in municipal elections in accordance with the 1862 law, and when women became eligible in municipal elections in 1909, she became engaged in local politics.

She was the deputy chairman of the Communal Council of Julita in 1913, the chairman in 1916, and a member of the board of directors of the city council in 1919–1930.  She was the chairman of the independent non-party political women's organisation Frisinnade kvinnors riksförbund of Södermanland in 1922–1931, and municipal communal speaker for Julita in 1933–1936.

In 1921, she became one of the five first women to be elected to the Swedish Parliament after women suffrage, alongside Nelly Thüring (Social Democrat), Agda Östlund (Social Democrat) and Bertha Wellin (Conservative) in the Lower chamber, and Kerstin Hesselgren in the Upper chamber.  She focused on women's rights issues, such as equal salaries for women and the access to all official professions for both sexes; the latter issue was addressed in 1919-1925 through the Behörighetslagen.  She was originally engaged within a Liberal party, but was from 1924, an independent. She served as an MP until 1924.

She continued to be active in municipal politics after she left parliament. She retired from politics, for health reasons, in 1936.

Women's rights work

Tamm wrote for the women's rights movements papers Tidevarvet and Vi kvinnor. She also founded and financed Tidevarvet and a Norwegian women's magazine Kvinnen og Tiden (1945–1955).

In 1925, she initiated the Kvinnliga Medborgarskolan ('Citizen School for Women') on her estate Fogelstad, where she served as chairman.

She was also active within ecology and wrote the book Fred med jorden (Peace with Earth) with Elin Wägner in 1940.

References

 Tvåkammarriksdagen 1867-1970 (Almqvist & Wiksell International 1988), band 1, s. 398
 Hvar 8 dag – illustreradt magasin 1921-1922, Bonniers tryckeri, Göteborg 1922 s.34
 Elisabeth Tamm på Fogelstad – liv och verk, Hjördis Levin (2003)

Further reading 
 

1880 births
1958 deaths
Members of the Riksdag
Women members of the Riksdag
20th-century Swedish writers
Swedish city councillors
Swedish women's rights activists
Swedish nobility
People from Södermanland County
Swedish non-fiction writers
Swedish women non-fiction writers
20th-century Swedish women writers
20th-century Swedish women politicians
20th-century Swedish politicians
20th-century non-fiction writers
Swedish magazine founders
Elisabeth